The Aviation Industry Corporation of China (AVIC) is a Chinese state-owned aerospace and defense conglomerate headquartered in Beijing. AVIC is overseen by the State-owned Assets Supervision and Administration Commission of the State Council. It is ranked 140th in the Fortune Global 500 list as of 2021, and has over 100 subsidiaries, 27 listed companies and 500,000 employees across the globe. AVIC is also the second largest defense contractor globally as of 2022 with a revenue exceeding US$79 billion and overseeing well over 100 subsidiaries.

History
Since being established on 1 April 1951 as the Aviation Industry Administration Commission, the aviation industry of the People's Republic of China has been through 12 systemic reforms.

AVIC purchased American aircraft engine manufacturer Continental Motors, Inc. in 2010, aircraft manufacturer Cirrus in 2011, and specialized parts supplier Align Aerospace in 2015. In 2015, AVIC and BHR Partners acquired U.S. automotive supplier Henniges, through a joint venture structure.

In 2016, Aero Engine Corporation of China was formed, capitalized with US$7.5 billion by Aviation Industry Corporation of China (AVIC) and Commercial Aircraft Corporation of China, Ltd. (COMAC) in order to consolidate aero-engine and related technologies.

Split and re-merger
China Aviation Industry Corporation was split into two separate entities, China Aviation Industry Corporation I and China Aviation Industry Corporation II in 1999. Both retained civilian and military aircraft production capabilities, along with a number of unrelated business ventures. The split was intended to foster competitiveness in the Chinese aerospace industry.

In 2008, AVIC I and AVIC II officially merged back together. The previous separation resulted in split resources and led to redundant projects. The goal of the merger was to eliminate this redundancy and spin off pursuits unrelated to aerospace, such as motorcycle and automobile parts manufacturing.

Espionage allegations 

In April 2009, The Wall Street Journal reported that computer spies, allegedly Chinese, "had penetrated the database of the Joint Strike Fighter program and acquired terabytes of secret information about the fighter, possibly compromising its future effectiveness." AVIC allegedly "incorporated the stolen know-how into China's Chengdu J-20 and Shenyang FC-31 fighters."

U.S. sanctions 

In November 2020, Donald Trump issued an executive order prohibiting any American company or individual from owning shares in companies that the United States Department of Defense has listed as having links to the People's Liberation Army, which included AVIC.

2022 Russian invasion of Ukraine 
In February 2023, the Center for Advanced Defense Studies reported that customs data showed that AVIC shipped parts for Sukhoi Su-35 fighter jets to a subsidiary of sanctioned Russian defense company Rostec following the 2022 Russian invasion of Ukraine.

Products

Airliner

Fighter aircraft

(*) indicates under development

J-10                 
Chengdu J-10S (Trainer)                          
Chengdu J-10D* (EW)                          
J-11
Shenyang J-11B/BG/BH
J-15
J-16
Shenyang J-16D (EW)
JF-17
J-20
Chengdu J-20A
Chengdu J-20S (Tandem seat)*
J-31

Fighter bomber aircraft
 JH-7

Trainer aircraft
 JL-8
 JL-9
 L-15

Transport aircraft
 Y-7
 Y-8
 Y-9
 Y-11
 Y-12                                                                                                                                                                                                                                                                                                 
Y-14
 Y-20 
 Xi'an YU-20 (Aerial Refueling) 
 MA60 
 MA600 
 MA700

Bomber aircraft
 H-6
 H-20*
J-XX*

AEW&C aircraft
 KJ-200
 KJ-500
KJ-600*
 KJ-2000

Helicopter
 AC313
 Z-8
 Z-9
 Z-9W/G
 Z-10
 Z-11
 Z-18
 Z-19
 Z-20
 AVIC Advanced Heavy Lifter*
 Z-15 / AC352 / EC175
 HC-120/EC120
 AC332

Unmanned aerial vehicle 
Pterodactyl I
Soar Dragon
AVIC Cloud Shadow

Electronic-warfare aircraft 

J-16D
Y-8DZ
Y-9G (GX-11)

Maritime-patrol aircraft 

Harbin SH-5
Harbin PS-5
AVIC AG600
Y-8FQ

See also
List of aircraft produced by China
Commercial Aircraft Corporation of China (COMAC)
Aero Engine Corporation of China (AECC)

Notes

References

External links

Government-owned companies of China
Aerospace companies of China
Aircraft manufacturers of China
Defence companies of the People's Republic of China
Manufacturing companies based in Beijing
Chinese companies established in 1993
Technology companies established in 1993
Manufacturing companies established in 1993
Chinese brands